Henosferidae (also spelled "Henospheridae") is an extinct family of Australosphenida, native to Gondwana during the Middle Jurassic. Its defined as a clade including the most recent common ancestor of Henosferus and Asfaltomylos and all its descendants.

References
 Averianov, A. O. & Lopatin, A. V., '"Phylogeny of truconodonts and symmetrodonts and the origin of extinct mammals"', Dokl Biol Sci 436:32-35.
 Rougier, G. W., Martinelli, A. G., Forasiepi, A. M. & Novacek, M. J. 2007. New Jurassic mammals from Patagonia, Argentina: A reappraisal of australosphenidan morphology and interrelationships. American Museum Novitates 3566: 1-54.

Jurassic mammals
Prehistoric mammal families